Staphylinochrous melanoleuca is a species of moth of the Anomoeotidae family. It is found in Uganda.

References

Endemic fauna of Uganda
Anomoeotidae
Insects of Uganda
Moths of Africa